Simon Patrick Tipping (born 24 October 1949) is a British former politician who served as Nottinghamshire Police and Crime Commissioner between 2012 and 2021. A member of the Labour Party, he was Member of Parliament (MP) for Sherwood from 1992 to 2010.

Early life
Tipping was born in Halifax. He went to Hipperholme Grammar School (then a state school) in Hipperholme in West Yorkshire. He gained a BA in Philosophy at Nottingham University in 1972 and an MA in Social Sciences in 1978. He was a social worker in Nottingham and Nottinghamshire from 1972 until 1979. Between 1979 and 1983 he was a Project Leader for the (Church of England) Children's Society in Nottingham. From 1981 to 1993 he was a Councillor on Nottinghamshire County Council.

Parliamentary career
Tipping contested Rushcliffe in 1987. He took Sherwood from the Conservatives in 1992.

Tipping served in a number of junior government positions, becoming Parliamentary Private Secretary to Home Secretary Jack Straw in 1997. In 1999 he was then promoted to Deputy Leader of the House of Commons, and was appointed a Parliamentary Under Secretary of State at the Privy Council Office, where he was responsible for dealing with issues relating to the year 2000 computer date problem. Following this, Tipping became Chairman of the sub-committee on Environment, Food and Rural Affairs in 2001 and, after a period on the backbenches, in 2006 he again served as Parliamentary Private Secretary to Jack Straw.

On 23 October 2009, Tipping announced his decision to stand down at the next general election, following a period of ill health, including a heart attack suffered in June 2009.

Police and Crime Commissioner
Tipping was elected as Nottinghamshire's Police and Crime Commissioner in the 2012 inaugural PCC election. He announced plans to pay a "pension" to cover medical bills and other expenses for retired police dogs, a move which dog handlers welcomed. He was re-elected for a second-term on 6 May 2016.

Tipping appointed Chris Cutland, previously executive director of Women's Aid in Nottingham, as his Deputy in November 2012. The appointment of Emma Foody as replacement, also previously with Women's Aid in Nottingham as a community ambassador, was confirmed in June 2020.

At the 2021 PCC election, he was defeated by Conservative Caroline Henry. Afterwards, he confirmed his intention to continue campaigning on behalf of the Labour group.

Personal life
Tipping is one of several vice-presidents of the Ramblers Association. He married Irene Margaret Quinn on 8 January 1970 in Nottingham; she died in February 2011. They have two daughters.

References

External links
 Paddy Tipping Police Commissioner Campaign Official website
 
 Paddy Tipping MP TheyWorkForYou.com

1949 births
Living people
Labour Party (UK) MPs for English constituencies
Members of Nottinghamshire County Council
UK MPs 1992–1997
UK MPs 1997–2001
UK MPs 2001–2005
UK MPs 2005–2010
Police and crime commissioners in England
Alumni of the University of Nottingham
People from Halifax, West Yorkshire
Labour Party police and crime commissioners
People educated at Hipperholme Grammar School